Jorge Rafael Aguilar Paredes (born 9 March 1966) is a Honduran politician, he is President of his party, and presidential candidate of the Innovation and Unity Party for the 2013 general elections.

References

1966 births
Living people
Candidates for President of Honduras
Innovation and Unity Party politicians